Kristy Kiernan is the author of Catching Genius (Berkley Books), a novel about two sisters whose lives are altered when one is discovered to be profoundly gifted. Catching Genius was an Ingram's Book Club selection and has received praise from authors such as Sarah Gruen and Lorna Landvik. Kiernan attended several gifted programs as a child, from which she drew her ideas for Catching Genius.

She lives in Florida with her husband and dog. Kiernan also blogs with the Debutante Ball, a team blog of new novelists. Her new book, Matters of Faith, was published in 2008 and received the Florida Book Awards Bronze Medal. Her third novel, "Between Friends" was published in 2010.

Bibliography
 Catching Genius (2007)
 Matters of Faith (2008)
 Between Friends (2010)

References

 Mostly Fiction Book Review
 Southwest Florida News-Press
https://web.archive.org/web/20101225134844/http://www.crazy-for-books.com/2010/04/author-interview-kristy-kiernan.html
http://www.publishersweekly.com/pw/by-topic/1-legacy/16-all-book-reviews/article/42137-fiction-book-reviews-2-22-2010.html
http://bookpage.wordpress.com/2009/11/17/author-meets-characters/

External links
 Personal website
 Blog
 Kristy Kiernan led discussion about Women's Fiction in LitChat on March 9, 2009

American women novelists
Year of birth missing (living people)
Living people
21st-century American novelists
21st-century American women writers